Fiwaga (Fimaga, Fiwage) is a Papuan language of Papua New Guinea.

Pronouns are:
{|
! !!sg!!du!!pl
|-
!1
|ano||etoteto*||re
|-
!2
|né||tetā||i
|-
!3
|e||isu|| –
|}

*Eto is exclusive, teto inclusive.

References

Languages of Southern Highlands Province
East Kutubuan languages